Wat Chai Mongkhon (also spelled Chai Mongkol) is a Buddhist temple (wat) in Chiang Mai in  northern Thailand. The temple is located by the Ping River, on Charoen Prathet Road in the old city center. It is believed to have been built during the reign of King Tilokaraj (1441–1487), and serves an old Mon community. Its architecture demonstrates Amarapura–Mandalay influence.

References 

Chai Mongkhon